Dora García (born 1965) is a contemporary Spanish artist. García draws on interactivity and performance in her work, using the exhibition space as a platform to investigate the relationship between artwork, audience, and place. García transforms spaces into a sensory experiences by altering perception and creating situations of interaction, often using intermediaries (professional actors, amateurs, or people she meets by chance) to enhance critical thinking. By engaging with the binary of reality vs. fiction, visitors become implicated as protagonists either in the construction of a collective fiction or questioning of empirical constructions–sometimes knowingly, and sometimes not. Since 1999 García has created several artworks on the web.

Work 
Dora García was born in Spain and studied in Amsterdam, The Netherlands. As a young artist she moved to Brussels where she lived for 16 years.

She participated with the real time theatre in public space "The Beggar's Opera". in Münster Sculpture Projects 2007, where the character Charles Filch made his first appearance in her work. She has always been interested in anti-heroic and marginal personas as a prototype to study the social status of the artist, and in narratives of resistance and counterculture. In this regard, Dora García has developed works on the DDR political police, the Stasi ("Rooms, Conversations", film, 24 ', 2006), on the charismatic figure of US stand up comedian Lenny Bruce ("Just because everything is different it does not mean that anything has changed, Lenny Bruce in Sydney", one-time performance, Sydney Biennale, 2008) or on the origins, rhizomatic associations and consequences of antipsychiatry ("Mad Marginal" book series since 2010, "The Deviant Majority", film, 34', 2010).

In the last years, she has used classical TV formats to research Germany's most recent history ("Die Klau Mich Show", Documenta13, 2012), frequented Finnegans Wake reading groups ("The Joycean Society", film, 53', 2013), created meeting points for voice hearers ("The Hearing Voices Café", since 2014) and researched the crossover between performance and psychoanalysis ("The Sinthome Score", 2013, and "Segunda Vez", 2017).

She represented Spain at the 54th Venice Biennale in 2011, and presented her work in the next Biennale 2013 in the collateral events, and in the international exhibition of the Biennale 2015, curated by Okwui Ewenzor.

Biography 
García was born in Valladolid, Spain and studied Fine Arts at the University of Salamanca, Spain, and the Rijksakademie in Amsterdam, Holland. She is represented by Michel Rein Gallery, Paris/Brussels, ProjecteSD Barcelona, galería Juana de Aizpuru, Madrid, and Ellen de Bruijne Projects, Amsterdam.

Awards 
In 2021 Dora García  received the National Award for Plastic Arts.

Selected exhibitions 
Selected exhibitions include: documenta 13, Kassel, Germany, 2012; Gwangju Biennale, South Korea, 2010; Lyon Biennial, France, 2009; TATE Modern, London, UK, 2008; Centre Pompidou, Paris, France, 2008; SMAK, Gent, Belgium, 2006, MUSAC, Leon, Spain, 2004, MACBA, Barcelona, Spain, 2002.

Selected collections 
 Museo Nacional Centro de Arte Reina Sofía, Madrid, Spain
 Fundación La Caixa Collection, Barcelona, Spain
 Coca-Cola Foundation Collection, Spain
 Museo de Vitoria, Spain
 MUSAC, León, Spain
 MACBA, Barcelona, Spain
 Centro Andaluz de Arte Contemporáneo, Sevilla, Spain
 FRAC Bourgogne, Dijon, France
 FRAC Languedoc-Rousillon, Montpellier, France
 FRAC Lorraine, Metz, France
 FRAC Ile-de-France Le Plateau, Paris, France
 Fundación ARCO, Spain
 Henry Art Foundation, Seattle, USA
 Galerie Fur Zeitgenössische Kunst, Leipzig, Germany
 Centre National des Arts Plastiques, France
 SFMOMA, San Francisco 
 Kadist Art Foundation, Paris, San Francisco

References

External links 
 
 http://artreview.com/opinion/september_2014_opinion_maria_lind/
 https://web.archive.org/web/20140209135159/http://input.es/en/analysis/the-joycean-society-dora-garcia/
 http://www.projectesd.com/index.php/books/detail/garcia_dora/

1965 births
Living people
20th-century Spanish women artists
21st-century Spanish women artists
Spanish contemporary artists
University of Salamanca alumni
Women conceptual artists